is a former Japanese football player.

Playing career
Sakamoto was born in Yasu on December 3, 1978. After graduating from Shizuoka Gakuen High School, he joined J1 League club Júbilo Iwata in 1997. Although he played several matches as substitute forward in J.League Cup, he could hardly play in the match. In 2000, he moved to J2 League club Shonan Bellmare. Although he could not play at all in the match in 2000, he became a regular player as offensive midfielder from 2001 and played many matches for a long time. In 2007, he was converted to defensive midfielder. However he was returned to offensive midfielder by manager Yasuharu Sorimachi in 2009. The club also won the 3rd place in 2009 and was promoted to J1 from 2010. However the club finished at bottom place in 2010 and was relegated to J2 in a year. In 2012, he lost his regular position and played many matches as substitute. He retired end of 2012 season.

Sakamoto played 456 J.League games for Shonan Bellmare (a club record) between 2000 and 2012, also being for many years the team's captain.

Club statistics

References

External links

1978 births
Living people
Association football people from Shiga Prefecture
Japanese footballers
J1 League players
J2 League players
Júbilo Iwata players
Shonan Bellmare players
Association football midfielders